Tirta Empul temple is a Hindu Balinese water temple located near the town of Tampaksiring, Bali, Indonesia. The temple compound consists of a petirtaan or bathing structure, famous for its holy spring water, where Balinese Hindus go to for ritual purification. The temple pond has a spring which gives out fresh water regularly, which Balinese Hindus consider to be holy or amritha. Tirta Empul means Holy Spring in Balinese.

Construction of the temple
Tirta Empul Temple was founded around a large water spring in 962 A.D. during the Warmadewa dynasty (10th-14th centuries). The name of the temple comes from the ground water source named "Tirta Empul". The spring is the source of the Pakerisan river. The temple is divided into three sections: Jaba Pura (front yard), Jaba Tengah (central yard) and Jeroan (inner yard). Jaba Tengah contains 2 pools with 30 showers which are named accordingly: Pengelukatan, Pebersihan and Sudamala dan Pancuran Cetik (poison).

The temple is dedicated to Vishnu, another Hindu god name for the supreme consciousness Narayana. 
On a hill overlooking the temple, a modern villa was built for President Sukarno's visit in 1954. The villa is currently a rest house for important guests.

Water quality
For most of the time, Tirta Empul is believed as a source of clean water for ritual bathing. However, according to a Coconut Bali report in 2017, authorities were investigating reports of water pollution and health risk at Tirta Empul from Gianyar.

See also

 Balinese Hinduism
 List of Hindu temples in Indonesia

References

Hindu temples in Indonesia
10th-century Hindu temples
Cultural Properties of Indonesia in Bali
Gianyar Regency